KFUG-LP is a low power radio station broadcasting a community radio format from Crescent City, California.

On January 30, 2017, KFUG-LP was granted a Federal Communications Commission construction permit to move to a new transmitter site. The effective radiated power will remain 100 watts. The height above average terrain would decrease to -56.2 meters (-184.38 feet).

History
KFUG-LP began broadcasting as KFDG-LP on September 21, 2015, switching to its current call sign a little over a month later on October 22, 2015.

References

External links
 

2015 establishments in California
Crescent City, California
FUG-LP
FUG-LP
Community radio stations in the United States
Radio stations established in 2015